Sidney S. "Sid" Eagles Jr. served as a judge of the North Carolina Court of Appeals from 1983 until January 2004.  At the time of his retirement, Eagles was serving as Chief Judge of that court.  Before his judicial service, Eagles worked as counsel to the Speaker of the North Carolina House of Representatives and as a special deputy Attorney General.

A graduate of Wake Forest University and the Wake Forest University School of Law, Judge Eagles has served as a member of the Board of Visitors for the Wake Forest University School of Law and as Chairperson of the Board of Trustees of Barton College.  He is a retired Colonel in the U.S. Air Force Reserve, where he was awarded the Legion of Merit upon his retirement.

Today Eagles is Retired Counsel of the law firm Fox Rothschild.  His practice focuses on alternative dispute resolution.

References
Fox Rothschild Biographical Page

Year of birth missing (living people)
Living people
North Carolina Court of Appeals judges
North Carolina lawyers
Wake Forest University alumni
Wake Forest University School of Law alumni
Recipients of the Legion of Merit